Newport 1958 or Live at Newport 1958, etc. can refer to one of several albums recorded at the 1958 Newport Jazz Festival.

 Newport 1958, a Duke Ellington album on Columbia Records
 Newport '58, a Dinah Washington album on EmArcy Records
 Live at Newport '58, a Horace Silver album on Blue Note Records - released in 2008
 At Newport 1958, a Miles Davis album on Columbia Records - released in 1964
 Live at Newport 1958 & 1963, a Sony Records album released in 1994 of live recordings made of Miles Davis and Thelonious Monk at the Newport Jazz Festivals in 1958 and 1963
 Newport 1958, Columbia Records recording of the Dave Brubeck Quartet
 Live at Newport 1958, a Mahalia Jackson recording from Columbia Records

See also:
 At Newport (disambiguation)
 Miles & Monk at Newport, Columbia Records album recorded live at the 1958 (Davis) and 1963 (Monk) Newport Jazz Festivals
 Ray Charles at Newport, Atlantic Records recording of Ray Charles at the 1958 Newport Jazz Festival
 Miles & Coltrane, Columbia Records release includes recordings from the 1958 Newport Jazz Festival
 Jazz on a Summer's Day, a 1960 documentary film set at the 1958 Newport Jazz Festival